The Allen Chapel A.M.E. Church in Murfreesboro, Tennessee is a historic African Methodist Episcopal church at 224 S. Maney Avenue.  It was built in 1889 and added to the National Register in 1995.

It is a one-story brick building on a brick foundation.   The congregation, established in 1866, is the oldest African-American congregation in Rutherford County.

References

African Methodist Episcopal churches in Tennessee
Churches on the National Register of Historic Places in Tennessee
Buildings and structures in Murfreesboro, Tennessee
Churches in Rutherford County, Tennessee
National Register of Historic Places in Rutherford County, Tennessee